The Harrison National Bank building is a two-story brick building located at 101 East Main Street in Cadiz, Ohio. The building was placed on the National Register on December 23, 1993.

History
The State Bank of Ohio was founded in 1841 and quickly spread to various parts of Ohio, including Cadiz. The bank operated until 1847, when the Harrison County branch changed its charter and was renamed the Harrison National Bank. The building was built almost 40 years later by architect Charles Hamilton.

Exterior
The structure is built of red brick with a smooth stone foundation. The first floor, or basement, serves as storefront and can be accessed only by Main Street. The main entrance is located at the corner and is reached by a flight of stairs. The recessed door is framed by an arch with supportive Ionic columns. Lining the curve of an arch was a sign reading "Harrison National Bank", but now reads "Rosebud Mining Company", the current occupants.

The façade of the building contains two floors of large arched windows with decorative capstones. The flat roof is hidden behind a machicolated solid balustrade. Two large brick chimneys can be seen rising from the roof. A side entrance is located on the left side of the building and was once used as a staff entrance.

References

Buildings and structures in Harrison County, Ohio
National Register of Historic Places in Harrison County, Ohio
Commercial buildings on the National Register of Historic Places in Ohio
Queen Anne architecture in Ohio
Commercial buildings completed in 1886
U.S. Route 250